The , meaning "Pine Needle Society," is a yakuza organization based in Tokyo, Japan. The Matsuba-kai is a designated yakuza group with an estimated 360 active members as of 2020.

The Matsuba-kai is a member of a yakuza fraternal federation named the Kantō Hatsuka-kai, along with four other Kantō-based yakuza syndicates, the Sumiyoshi-kai, the Inagawa-kai, the Toa-kai, and the Soai-kai.

History
In 1946 the were involved in the 1946 Shibuya incident where they fought for control of the local black markets. The Sekine-gumi rapidly expanded, but in 1947 many members were arrested by GHQ for firearms possession, resulting in the group being forced into disbanding. The remnants of the gang came together with the remnants of another gang, the Fujita-gumi, to found a new organization called the "Matsuba-kai" in March 1953.

In April 1960, Matsuba-kai thugs ransacked the Tokyo headquarters of the Mainichi Shimbun newspaper in revenge for unfavorable coverage. In late 1960 and early, members of the Matsuba-kai mounted protests outside the offices of the literary magazine Chūō Kōron in protest of magazine's publication of Shichirō Fukazawa's short story "The Tale of an Elegant Dream”
(Fūryū mutan), which described the beheading of the Imperial family with a guillotine.

In the 1980s when the gang was caught smuggling 12 kilos of heroin into Canada.

The Matsuba-kai was registered as a designated yakuza group under the Organized Crime Countermeasures Law in 1994.

In the early 2000s the Matsuba-kai was involved in a violent feud with the rival Kyokuto-kai, which led to a number of shootings. In early 2005, it was revealed that the Urayasu-based cleaning company contracted to Tokyo Disney Resort was run by a member of the Matsuba-kai, Saburō Shiga.

References

Organizations established in 1936
1936 establishments in Japan
Yakuza groups